Mickelson is a Norwegian patronymic surname, literally meaning son of Michael or Mikkel (one who was like God). Notable people with the surname include:

Anna Mickelson, American rower
Asgeir Mickelson, Norwegian musician
George S. Mickelson (1941–1993), American politician
George T. Mickelson (1903–1965), eighteenth Governor of South Dakota
Nicholas Mickelson (born 1999), Thai footballer
Phil Mickelson (born 1970), American professional golfer

See also
George S. Mickelson Trail, rail trail
Michelson (disambiguation)
Michaelson
Michaelsen
Michelsen (surname)

Norwegian-language surnames
Patronymic surnames
Surnames from given names